Corbetta (1,401 m) is a mountain of the Swiss Prealps, in the canton of Fribourg.

Geography

Situation 
Corbetta stands between the Swiss plateau and the Swiss Alps. The city of Châtel-St-Denis and the A12 motorway are located on its western foot. The village of Les Paccots is located on its north and east slopes.

The panorama from its summit offers a nice view on the Dent de Lys, the lake of Geneva and the Jura Mountains.

Hydrology 

On its north foot lies the Veveyse de Châtel river, feeding the lake of Geneva. On the east foothills, at 1,235 m, lies the protected site of the Lac des Joncs.

Activities 
Corbetta slopes are included in the small ski resort of Les Paccots. Three surface lifts bring the skiers to the summit.

References

External links 
 Les Paccots and Region tourism office

Mountains of Switzerland
Mountains of the Alps
Mountains of the canton of Fribourg
One-thousanders of Switzerland